Mohammad Reza Eskandari was the Minister of Agriculture of the Islamic Republic of Iran from 2005 to 2009.

References

External links
Iran: Government Shakeup Hits Many Levels

Government ministers of Iran
Agriculture in Iran
Living people
People from Ahvaz
1960 births
Impeached Iranian officials
Front of Islamic Revolution Stability politicians
Islamic Revolutionary Guard Corps officers
Iranian individuals subject to the U.S. Department of the Treasury sanctions